Rhamnidium caloneurum is a species of plant in the family Rhamnaceae. It is endemic to Panama.

References

Flora of Panama
caloneurum
Data deficient plants
Taxonomy articles created by Polbot